With These Hands... is a jazz album by American jazz pianist Randy Weston, featuring saxophonist Cecil Payne, which was recorded in 1956 and released on the Riverside label.

Reception

Allmusic awarded the album 4 stars, describing it as being "one of pianist Randy Weston's lesser-known sets".

Track listing 
All compositions by Randy Weston except as indicated
 "The Man I Love" (George Gershwin, Ira Gershwin) - 4:05   
 "Serenade in Blue" (Mack Gordon, Harry Warren) - 2:56   
 "I Can't Get Started" (Vernon Duke, Ira Gershwin) - 8:47   
 "This Can't Be Love" (Lorenz Hart, Richard Rodgers) - 3:02   
 "These Foolish Things" (Harry Link, Holt Marvell, Jack Strachey) - 4:39  
 "Lifetime" - 4:18   
 "Do Nothing till You Hear from Me" (Duke Ellington, Bob Russell) - 5:16   
 "Little Niles" - 4:54

Personnel
Randy Weston - piano 
Cecil Payne - baritone saxophone (except 2 and 4)
Ahmed Abdul-Malik - bass
Wilbert Hogan - drums

References 

Randy Weston albums
1956 albums
Riverside Records albums
Albums produced by Orrin Keepnews
Albums recorded at Van Gelder Studio